Business History is a peer-reviewed academic journal covering the field of business history. It was established in 1958 by Liverpool University Press and is now published by Taylor and Francis. The joint editor-in-chief are Stephanie Decker (University of Birmingham, UK, and University of Gothenburg, Sweden), Christina Lubinski (Copenhagen Business School, Denmark), and Niall MacKenzie (Adams Smith Business School, University of Glasgow, Scotland).

Aims and scope
Business History is an international journal concerned with how businesses, organizations, and their environment develop over time, and how this influences contemporary organizations. It publishes interdisciplinary articles that contribute new insights into the past activities of organizations and their major stakeholders. Research in business history makes (1) empirical contributions by presenting new historical sources, which may be archival, visual or material, as well as oral history; (2) historiographic contributions, by engaging with research controversies in the field of business history, building new conceptual frameworks for understanding business or organizational activity in the past; or challenge existing conceptual frameworks that have shaped our understanding of the past; (3) theoretical contributions by using historical research to contribute to relevant social science and organizational theories by drawing on the past as an empirical setting. Business History continues to widen and deepen its international scope by promoting research on under-researched regions, time periods and topics.

Business History publishes a book review section in all its regular issues, 3 to 4 Special Issues a year, and curated lists of relevant literature as Collections. 

For Open Access articles, please visit https://www.tandfonline.com/action/showOpenAccess?journalCode=fbsh20

Business History also publishes literature reviews and comments as Perspectives articles, which are commissioned as proposals and guided by editors through a more developmental review process (De Jong et al., 2017) . All submissions should follow the journal style, and particularly note that Business History now uses in-text citations (APA). 

For guidance on how to cite historical sources with in-text citations, you can consult a dedicated editorial on the subject (Decker et al., 2018) .

Business History publishes a book review section in all its regular issues, 3 to 4 Special Issues a year, and curated lists of relevant literature as Collections. For more information on special issues, the website and this freely available editorial provides further information (Colli et al., 2016) .

Business History is on social media, on Twitter and LinkedIn. Please follow the conversation and business history (#bizhis) community there.

Abstracting and indexing 
The journal is abstracted and indexed in:

According to the Journal Citation Reports, the journal has a 2013 impact factor of 0.564.

References

External links
 

History journals
Taylor & Francis academic journals
Publications established in 1958
English-language journals
Business and management journals
History of business
8 times per year journals